Paul Francis Berrill (born 17 December 1964) is a former English cricketer. Berrill was a right-handed batsman who bowled right-arm off break.

Berrill played 2 List-A matches for Huntingdonshire in the 2000 NatWest Trophy against a Hampshire Cricket Board side and a Yorkshire Cricket Board.  In his 2 matches he scored just 10 runs.

References

External links
Paul Berrill at Cricinfo
Paul Berrill at CricketArchive

1964 births
Living people
Cricketers from Cambridgeshire
Sportspeople from Cambridge
English cricketers
Huntingdonshire cricketers